The Coat of Arms of the Polish–Lithuanian Commonwealth was the symbol of the Polish–Lithuanian Commonwealth, representing the union of the Crown of the Polish Kingdom and Grand Duchy of Lithuania.

Modern reconstruction

Background
The Coat of Arms of the Commonwealth combined the Coat of Arms of the Kingdom of Poland and the Grand Duchy of Lithuania, which are depicted as follows:

During the Commonwealth, an inescutcheon contained the person or family arms of the reigning Monarch.

Insurrections
During the January uprising a similar coat of arms was proposed for the restored Commonwealth, with Archangel Michael, the coat of arms of Ruthenia added as the third element. However, it was never officially introduced.

The coat of arms in various cities

See also
 Polish heraldry
 Coat of arms of Poland

Notes

References

Polish-Lithuanian Commonwealth
Polish-Lithuanian Commonwealth
Polish-Lithuanian Commonwealth
Polish–Lithuanian Commonwealth